James B. Carden House is a historic home located near Summersville, Nicholas County, West Virginia.  It was built in 1885, and is a two-story, "T"-plan, frame, Folk Victorian style house. It features a two-story front porch running the full width of the house. Also on the property are an end gable barn and a small workshop.  It has been occupied since 1971, by a restaurant known as the Country Road Inn-Mama Jerrols.

It was listed on the National Register of Historic Places in 2001.

References

Houses on the National Register of Historic Places in West Virginia
Houses completed in 1885
Houses in Nicholas County, West Virginia
National Register of Historic Places in Nicholas County, West Virginia
Victorian architecture in West Virginia
Folk Victorian architecture in the United States